Voronin, or Voronina (feminine: Воронина), is a Balto-Slavic last name, most commonly found in Belarus, Russia and Ukraine from Proto-Balto-Slavic word "warnás" meaning raven or crow. Other spelling variant of the name is Woronin (feminine; Woronina), and the Baltic variants of the last name are Vārnas, Voroņins and Varoņins. A similar last name can be found in Finnic countries in the form of Varonen or Vares. The last name is related to Rus/Baltic Sailors, Vikings and Ushkuyniks, because ravens were widely used to navigate the sea.

People
 Aleksandr Voronin (1951-1992), a Russian olympic weightlifter
 Alexandra Voronin (1905-1993), first a wife of fascist leader of Norway, Vidkun Quisling
 Anatoly Voronin (1951–2006), business chief of Itar-TASS
 Andriy Voronin, a Ukrainian footballer
 Andrei Voronin (1900–1979), a Soviet army officer and Hero of the Soviet Union
 Inga Voronina, a Soviet speed skater (maiden name: Inga Artamonova)
 Irina Voronina, a Russian model
 Lev Voronin (1928–2006), a Soviet politician and post-Soviet banker
 Lev Voronin (handballer), a Russian team handball player
 Lola Voronina (b. 1983), Russian politician (PPRU) and co-chairperson of Pirate Parties International (PPI)
 Mikhail Voronin, Soviet gymnast who won two Olympic gold medals in 1968
 Mikhail Voronin (fashion designer), a Ukrainian fashion designer and businessman 
 Mikhail Stepanovich Voronin (1838–1903), a Russian botanist
 Natalya Voronina (b. 1994), Russian speed skater
 Oleg Voronin, son of Vladimir Voronin
 Serhiy Voronin, a Ukrainian footballer
 Valery Voronin, Soviet footballer, ranked Best Player of the USSR in 1964 & 1965
 Vladimir Voronin, former president of the Republic of Moldova (2001-2009)
 Vladimir Voronin (captain), Soviet Navy captain and polar explorer
 Vyacheslav Voronin, a Russian athlete
 Zinaida Voronina, a Soviet gymnast
 Marian Woronin, a Polish sprinter

Places
Voronina Island, a group of two islands in the Kara Sea.

See also
 Yakov Kolokolnikov-Voronin
 Marian Woronin

Surnames
Russian-language surnames